Federation of Western India Cine Employees (FWICE) is a film industry worker's union in Mumbai, India. As of 2020 it had 500,000 members. FWICE is mother body of all Indian Cinema Association.

Affiliations
FWICE is a member of UNI APRO, itself part of Union Network International (UNI).
AFVE and AVA are FWICE affiliates.

Affiliated Associations
31 Associations affiliated by FWICE, which is as below

Committee members
Current committee members of FWICE are below:

See also

 Association of Motion Pictures & TV Programme Producer of India
 Bollywood
 Cinema of India
IFTDA

External links
 seagate award news release
 Official Website

References

Trade unions in India
Trade unions in Maharashtra
Entertainment industry unions
Film organisations in India
Trade unions established in 1958
Film industry in Mumbai
1958 establishments in Bombay State